Anything Else but the Truth is the first full-length album by The Honorary Title.  The album was originally released in 2004, but was later re-released with different album art in 2006.

Track listing

Rerelease album
The rerelease album comes with a second disk contained five bonus songs and music videos of "Everything I Once Had" and "Bridge and Tunnel".

Notes

2004 debut albums
The Honorary Title albums
Doghouse Records albums